The Dynospectrum is a studio album by The Dynospectrum, a collaboration between rappers Slug, I Self Devine, Sab the Artist, and Swift. They performed under the pseudonyms Sep Sev Sev Two, Pat Juba, General Woundwart, and Mr. Gene Poole, respectively. The production was handled by Ant, who assumed the name Solomon Grundy for the project. It was released on Rhymesayers Entertainment on October 13, 1998.

In a 2008 interview with Impose, Slug said: "When we made the Dynospectrum, I was so high, I really thought we were like a legion of superheroes." In 2015, he picked it as one of the label's most underrated albums.

Critical reception

Peter S. Scholtes of City Pages placed the album at number 10 on the "Top Local Records of 1998" list, describing it as "a dense, tense, ultimately rewarding journey into hip hop's dark heart." Writing for City Pages in 2013, Chaz Kangas called it "one of the greatest hidden treasures of the Rhymesayers catalog". In that year, Potholes in My Blog placed it at number 7 on the "12 Best Rhymesayers Albums" list.

Track listing

Personnel
Credits adapted from liner notes.

 Sep Sev Sev Two (Slug) – vocals
 Pat Juba (I Self Devine) – vocals
 General Woundwart (Sab the Artist) – vocals
 Mr. Gene Poole (Swift) – vocals
 Solomon Grundy (Ant) – production, turntables, recording, mixing
 Dr. Moreau – recording, mixing, layout, design
 Abuse (Aaron Horkey) – artwork, layout, design
 Kevin Craig – photography

References

External links
 

1998 albums
Rhymesayers Entertainment albums
Hip hop albums by American artists
Albums produced by Ant (producer)